Ahnfeltia is a genus of red algae.

The type species is Ahnfeltia plicata. Some other species of this genus:
 Ahnfeltia setacea
 Ahnfeltia svensonii
 Ahnfeltia tobuchiensis
 Ahnfeltia torulosa

References 

Red algae genera
Florideophyceae